WZST is an adult hits formatted broadcast radio station licensed to Westover, West Virginia, serving the Morgantown/Fairmont area.  WZST is owned and operated by Laurel Highland Total Communications, Inc., through licensee LHTC Media of West Virginia, Inc.

History

The station branded itself as Star 100.9 featuring a country music format before switching to the current format in June 2008.

In the 1990s, the station was AC formatted known as "Mix 100.9" WMQC. WMQC simulcasted (to better serve Clarksburg) with former sister station WPDX-FM , which was known as "Mix 104.9", prior to becoming a classic country station.

On December 22, 2016, current owner LHTC Media announced that following the end of their Christmas music stint on the 26th, WZST would flip to variety hits, utilizing the small market Jack FM network, as "100.9 Jack FM". WZST will also retain all of the West Virginia University sports broadcasts it carries, including football, men's and women's basketball, and baseball.

Previous logo

References

External links

Jack FM Online

ZST
Jack FM stations
Adult hits radio stations in the United States